Barefooting may refer to:
Barefoot skiing
Barefoot hiking
Barefoot running
 Going barefoot

Barefootin' may refer to:
Barefootin', an autobiography by Unita Blackwell
"Barefootin'" (song), a 1965 song by Robert Parker

See also
Barefoot